The 2012–13 Championnat de France amateur was the 15th season since its establishment. CA Bastia was the previous season's club champions. The teams and groups were announced in July 2012. The season began on 11 August and ended on 25 May 2013.

Teams 

There were eight promoted teams from the Championnat de France amateur 2, replacing the seven teams that were relegated from the Championnat de France amateur following the 2011–12 season. A total of 72 teams competed in the league with 12 clubs suffering relegation to the fifth division, the Championnat de France amateur 2. All non-reserve clubs that secured league status for the season were subject to approval by the DNCG before becoming eligible to participate in the competition.

Teams relegated to Championnat de France amateur from Championnat National
 Bayonne
 Beauvais
 Besançon
 Martigues

Teams promoted to Championnat de France amateur from Championnat de France amateur 2
 Chambly
 Grenoble
 Montceau Bourgogne
 Roye-Noyon
 Saint-Malo
 Stade Bordelais
 Strasbourg
 Trélissac

DNCG rulings 

On 5 June 2012, following a preliminary review of each club's administrative and financial accounts in the Championnat de France amateur, the DNCG ruled that Pacy Vallée-d'Eure and Besançon would be excluded from participating in the CFA and would be relegated to the Division d'Honneur. Besançon later declared bankruptcy. The organization also confirmed its refusal to allow Montceau Bourgogne and Roye-Noyon promotion to the fourth division. All rulings were subject to appeal. On 26 June, the DNCG ruled that Agde would be relegated to the fifth division due to financial irregularities. A month later, Sénart-Moissy was excluded from participation in the CFA.

On 5 July, appeals for both Montceau Bourgogne and Roye-Noyon were heard. After deliberation, the DNCG ruled in favor of allowing each club promotion to the CFA. After failing in a similar appeal, Agde announced that it would appeal to the CNOSF, the National Sporting Committee of France, in order to remain in the CFA. Sénart-Moissy's appeal was also rejected by the DNCG resulting in the club falling to the fifth division.

League tables

Group A

Results

Group B

Results

Group C

Results

Group D

Results

References

External links 
 Official site
 Standings and statistics 

 

Championnat National 2 seasons
4
France